The development of Shipbuilding Institute of Polytechnic Surabaya or SHIPS (in Indonesian : Politeknik Perkapalan Negeri Surabaya (PPNS)) can be traced back to 1987 when it was established as a polytechnic by Sepuluh Nopember Institute of Technology (ITS) The institute was elevated to an independent institute in 2012.

SHIPS as a state polytechnic offers courses and training in the field of shipbuilding and marine-related industries.

Facilities
Laboratories:
 Automatic Fire Extinguisher Laboratory 
 Ergonomic Laboratory
 Workplace Measurement Laboratory
 Chemistry Laboratory 
 First Aid Laboratory
 CAD, CAM and Design Laboratory
 Non Metal Workshop (trial pond, mold loft, wooden ship and fiberglass ship workshop, wood dry oven)
 Construction laboratory (plat and profile bending, hydraulic cutting, plat, profile and pipe rolling, furnace, High Rigidity Axial Fid System CNC (3,3 m wide), CNC cutting, SMAW, GMAW and GTAW welding, NCP plasma cutting), Wire cutting (EDM), Injection Molding, etc.
 Material Testing Laboratory (DT and NDT)
 Basic Metal Workshop 
 Machining Workshop
 Pneumatic and Hydraulic Laboratory 
 Internal Combustion Engine Laboratory 
 Marine Diesel Simulator Laboratory
 External Combustion Engine Laboratory 
 Fluid and Cold storage system Laboratory
 Instrumentation, Basic Electric and Physic Laboratory 
 Electronic, Control and Microprocessor Laboratory
 Electric Machine Laboratory 
 Electrical Repair Laboratory
 Power Electronics and Drive Laboratory
 Robotic Camp

Other facilities
 Classroom, Visual Room, Theater and Teleconference Room.
 Library and Reading Room
 English Laboratory
 Internet and Computer Network
 Pray Room (Mushola)
 Music Room, 
 Sports field (volley, futsal, basketball, wall climbing)
 Directorat Building

Cooperation
The polytechnic cooperates with companies and institutions, e.g. : PT PAL Indonesia, companies based in Surabaya, Dikmenjur Dikdasmen DG, Ministry of National Affairs, PT INKA Madiun, Schlumberger, PT Freeport Indonesia, PT Komatsu Indonesia, PT Trakindo Utama, PT Esabindo Pratama, PT Pelindo III, Ministry of Manpower of Indonesia, East Java Manpower, American Bureau of Shipping, Bureau of Classification PT Indonesia, GTZ of Germany (1987–1998), PT Newmont, Bengkalis District Government, Local Government Lamongan

Department and Studies program
 1.Study Program D4 of Safety and Healthy Engineering
 2.Marine Engineering Department
   2.1 Study Program D3 of Marine Engineering
   2.2 Study Program D4 of Piping Engineering
2.3 Study Program D4 of Marine Engineering
 3.Ship Building Engineering Department
   3.1 Study Program D3 of Ship Building Engineering
   3.2 Study Program D3 of Ship Design and Construction
   3.3 Study Program D4 of Design and Manufacture Engineering
   3.4 Study Program D4 of Welding Engineering 
3.5 Study Program D4 Design Construction Engineering
 4. Marine Electrical Engineering Department
   4.1 Study Program D3  of Power Engineering
   4.2 Study Program D4 of Automation Engineering (Manufacturing)
4.3 Study Program D4 of Power Engineering
 5. Study Program D4 Waste Management Engineering
 6. Study Program D4 Applied Business Management

Degrees
PPNS Graduates on D3 (Diploma III) Program will have a graduation entitled as: Ahli Madya (A.Md.) known with associate degree as it has 3-years degree course
and on D4 (Diploma IV) Program with 4-years degree course entitled : Sarjana Sains Terapan (S.ST.) known also as Bachelor of Applied Science B.ASc.

Areas of employment
Not all companies where graduates have been placed are listed.
 Ship building - PT PAL, PT Dok & Shipping Surabaya, PT Dok & Shipping Koja Bahari Jakarta, PT. Dumas Shipyard, PT ASL Shipyard Batam, PT BATAMEC Shipyard Batam,
 Shipping - PT Pelni, PT Meratus,
 Mining - PT Freeport, PT Newmont, PT INCO,
 Oil and gas - PT Badak LNG, PT PERTAMINA, PT AGIP, TOTAL PT, PT Schlumberger,
 Manufacturing - PT Astra, PT Gutdner, PT Trakindo Utama, PT United Tractors, PT INKA,
 Construction - PT MECO, PT Bukit Jaya Abadi, PT Boma Bisma Indra, PT Swadaya Graha, PT ABB Alstom, PT Wijaya Karya,
 Chemical industries - PT Tjiwi Kimia, PT Petrokimia, PT Pupuk Sriwijaya, PT Unilever, PT Wings,
 Energy generating/power plants - PT PLN, PT EMOMY,
 Inspection - PT Sucofindo, ABS/American Bureau of Shipping, BKI/Bureau of Classification Indonesia, PT spectra,
 Banking and insurance - BNI, BRI, Adira Finance, Jasindo,
 Multimedia - Trans TV,
 Telecommunications - PT Indosat, PT Telkom,
 Civil servants (PNS), career officers (Police, Navy, Pol Airud).

Official website
Sepuluh Nopember Institute of Technology
Alumni

Colleges in Indonesia
Educational institutions in Surabaya